Willy and the Guardians of the Lake: Tales from the Lakeside Winter Adventure is a 2018 Hungarian animation family film written and directed by Zsólt Pálfi. The film is a sequel to the 2017 animation film Tales from the Lakeside. The film stars András Faragó, Anna Kubik and Tamás Markovics in the lead roles. The film was released on 6 December 2018 and received positive reviews from critics. It was also streamed via Netflix on 27 March 2020 until April 1, 2022. The film also received several awards and nominations in international film festivals.

Plot 
The green Verdies are small and minute, but yet are courageous guardians of the lakeside. Verdies only become guardians when they reach an age in which their hair turns brown in colour and until then life is boring. The green haired youngsters are not allowed to fly on warblers to row boats alone along the lake or even to ride wild frogs at the rodeo. Willy Whistle's big dream is to become a guardian one day but his curiosity always gets him into trouble.

Cast 
 András Faragó
 Anna Kubik
 Tamás Markovics
 Csongor Szalay
 Péter Bercsényi
 Róbert Bolla

References

External links 
 

2018 films
2010s Hungarian-language films
Hungarian animated films
2018 animated films